Colonel Albert Brassey (22 February 1844 – 7 January 1918) was a British rower, soldier and Conservative Member of Parliament for Banbury 1895-1906.

Life

Brassey was the fourth son of the railway contractor Thomas Brassey and his wife Maria, daughter of Thomas Harrison. The Liberal MP Thomas Brassey, 1st Earl Brassey, and Henry Brassey were his elder brothers and Henry Brassey, 1st Baron Brassey of Apethorpe, his nephew. He was educated at Eton and University College, Oxford. Brassey rowed bow to Charles Bennett Lawes’ stroke at Eton in the 1861 School Pulling and in the 1862 Eight. At Oxford, Brassey was a member of the winning University College crew in the Grand Challenge Cup and the Ladies' Challenge Plate at Henley Royal Regatta in 1863. In 1864 he was in the winning crew of the Visitors' Challenge Cup. In 1866, he was in the winning crews in the Grand rowing for Oxford Etonian, the Stewards' Challenge Cup for University College, and Visitors' .

Brassey was a Lieutenant in the 14th Hussars and a Colonel in the Queen's Own Oxfordshire Hussars and served as High Sheriff of Oxfordshire in 1878. In 1895 he entered Parliament for Banbury, a seat he held until 1906. He lived at Charlton Park, Gloucestershire, Heythrop Hall, Chipping Norton, Oxfordshire, and at 29 Berkeley Square, London.

Family

Brassey married the Hon. Maria Matilda Helena, daughter of John Charles Robert Bingham, 4th Baron Clanmorris, in 1871. They had three sons and five daughters.  He died in January 1918, aged 73. His wife, who was appointed an OBE in 1919, died in July 1943. Their eldest son Robert also represented Banbury in the House of Commons very briefly in 1910.

Notes

References

External links
 The Rowers of Vanity Fair - Brassey, Albert - “The Master of the Heythrop”
 

1844 births
1918 deaths
Conservative Party (UK) MPs for English constituencies
UK MPs 1895–1900
UK MPs 1900–1906
Albert Brassey
People educated at Eton College
Alumni of University College, Oxford
14th King's Hussars officers
High Sheriffs of Oxfordshire
English male rowers
Directors of the Great Western Railway
Queen's Own Oxfordshire Hussars officers